The Elateroidea are a large superfamily of beetles. It contains the familiar click beetles, fireflies, and soldier beetles and their relatives. It consists of about 25,000 species.

Description 
Elateroidea is a morphologically diverse group, including hard-bodied beetles with 5 abdominal ventrites, soft-bodied beetles with 7-8 ventrites connected with membranes (formerly known as cantharoids), and beetles with intermediate forms. They have a range of sizes and colours, but in terms of shape, they are usually narrow and parallel-sided as adults.

Many of the sclerotised elateroids (Cerophytidae, Eucnemidae, Throscidae, Elateridae) have a clicking mechanism. This is a peg on the prothorax which fits into a cavity in the mesothorax. When a click beetle bends its body, the peg snaps into the cavity, causing the beetle's body to straighten so suddenly that it jumps into the air.

Most beetles capable of bioluminescence are in the Elateroidea, in the families Lampyridae (~2000 species), Phengodidae (~200 species), Rhagophthalmidae (100 species) and Elateridae (>100 species).

Females in several lineages, including Lycidae, Lampyridae, Phengogidae and Rhagophthalmidae, do not pupate and remain in a larval form. This trait is estimated to have evolved independently at least three times within the superfamily.

Some Elateroidea, including species of Cantharidae and Lycidae, have bright aposematic colours to signal to predators that they are poisonous and so should not be eaten.

Families 
The validity and relationships of some families, such as Podabrocephalidae are not fully resolved. The family Rhinorhipidae has recently been removed to its own superfamily, with evidence that it is a basal taxon within Elateriformia dating to an Upper Triassic/Lower Jurassic split from other extant beetle lineages.
 Artematopodidae Lacordaire, 1857 – soft-bodied plant beetles (= Eurypogonidae)
 Brachypsectridae Leconte & Horn, 1883 – Texas beetles
 Cantharidae Imhoff, 1856 – soldier beetles
 Cerophytidae Latreille, 1834 – rare click beetles
 Elateridae Leach, 1815 – click beetles (including Ampedidae, Balgidae, Dicronychidae, Drilidae, Lissomidae, Plastoceridae, Prosternidae, Protelateridae, Pyrophoridae, Synaptidae) 
 Eucnemidae Eschscholtz, 1829 – false click beetles (including Anischiidae and Perothopidae)
 Iberobaeniidae Bocak et al., 2016
 Jurasaidae Rosa, Costa, Klamp & Kundrata, 2020
 Lycidae – net-winged beetles
 Omethidae LeConte, 1861 – false firefly beetles (including Telegeusidae)
 Throscidae Laporte, 1840 – false metallic wood-boring beetles (= Trixagidae)
 †Mysteriomorphidae Alekseev and Ellenberger, 2019 (Cretaceous)
 Lampyroid clade 
 †Cretophengodidae Li, Kundrata, Tihelka & Cai, 2021 (Cretaceous)
 Lampyridae Latreille, 1817 – firefly beetles
 Phengodidae LeConte 1861 – glowworm beetles (including Cydistinae)
 Rhagophthalmidae Olivier, 1907 (sometimes in Phengodidae, might belong in Lampyridae)
 Sinopyrophoridae Bi & Li, 2019
Incertae sedis:
†Anoeuma Li, Kundrata & Cai, 2022 (Cretaceous)

Phylogeny 
Some morphological and molecular phylogenetic analyses find that Byrrhoidea is either a monophyletic or paraphyletic group closely related to Elateroidea.

Based on Kusy et al. 2018 and 2020

References

External links 

 Tree of Life - Elateroidea

 
Beetle superfamilies